Noyelles-sur-Sambre (literally Noyelles on Sambre) is a commune in the Nord department in northern France.

Heraldry

Notable people
Marcel Gromaire

See also
Communes of the Nord department

References

Noyellessursambre